Sanderlin is a surname. Notable people with the surname include:

Donald Sanderlin (1933–2013), Canadian sports shooter
Edward J. Sanderlin (1835–1909), African-American businessman
James B. Sanderlin (1929–1990), American lawyer